The Castra of Drobeta-Turnu Severin was built by Emperor Traian, in the Roman Dacia province.

Gallery

See also
List of castra

Notes

External links

Roman castra from Romania - Google Maps / Earth 

Drobeta-Turnu Severin
Roman Dacia
Archaeological sites in Romania
Buildings and structures in Mehedinți County
Historic monuments in Mehedinți County
Roman legionary fortresses in Romania
History of Oltenia